The Bessang Pass Natural Monument is a protected area and memorial that commemorates the victory on June 14, 1945, by Filipino soldiers serving the U.S. Army Forces in the Philippines Northern Luzon (USAFIP-NL) over the Imperial Japanese Army in the Battle of Bessang Pass which led to Japan's eventual surrender and end to World War II in the Philippines. The mountain pass was initially a component of the Tirad Pass National Park, declared in 1938 through Proclamation No. 294 by then President Manuel Luis Quezon. The national shrine was finally declared and reclassified as a natural monument under the National Integrated Protected Areas System in April 2000 through Proclamation No. 284 by President Joseph Estrada.

Description
Bessang Pass lies along Route 4, which is now known as the Tagudin–Cervantes–Sabangan Road (N205) in the barangay of Malaya.

The park contains pine forests as well as mossy type forests. It is crossed by the Bessang Creek and Matukbo River which provides the water supply for Cervantes and other surrounding communities. The park is also the habitat of 29 bird species, 5 mammals, and reptiles such as the monitor lizard and different species of snakes.

A monument honoring the 1,395 USAFIP-NL members killed during the battle was unveiled in the park in 1954.

See also
 Luzon tropical pine forests
 MacArthur Landing Memorial National Park
 Northern Luzon Heroes Hill National Park

References

Natural monuments of the Philippines
Mountain passes of the Philippines
National Shrines of the Philippines
World War II sites in the Philippines
Geography of Ilocos Sur
Tourist attractions in Ilocos Sur
Protected areas established in 1954
1954 establishments in the Philippines